Normain Heights Historic District is a national historic district located at Mishawaka, St. Joseph County, Indiana.  The district encompasses 224 contributing buildings and 1 contributing site in a planned post-World War II residential subdivision of Mishawaka.  It was developed between 1946 and 1951, and includes notable examples of Modern Movement architecture. They are in seven house types randomly scattered throughout the district and were designed for families with low-to-moderate incomes.

It was listed on the National Register of Historic Places in 2002.

References

Historic districts on the National Register of Historic Places in Indiana
Modernist architecture in Indiana
Historic districts in St. Joseph County, Indiana
National Register of Historic Places in St. Joseph County, Indiana